Belgium national field hockey team may refer to:
 Belgium men's national field hockey team
 Belgium women's national field hockey team